The  is an interchange of the Hanshin Expressway Kobe Route in Nishinomiya, Hyōgo, Japan. This is the ending point of the Meishin Expressway.

When the Meishin Expressway was first opened, interchange numbers were assigned in order from Nishinomiya, and this interchange was number one.

A route connecting the Meishin Expressway and Hanshin Expressway Bayshore Route is planned as "", and Ministry of Land, Infrastructure, Transport and Tourism proposes a route connecting this Interchange and Bayshore Route near .

Roads

 Hanshin Expressway Kobe Route (for Kobe)

History
September 6, 1964: Nishinomiya Interchange opened on the Meishin Expressway
February 23, 1970: Hanshin Expressway Kobe Route between Maya Interchange and Nishimiya Interchange was opened and connected.
June 27, 1980: Hanshin Expressway Kobe Route between Awaza Junction and Nishinomiya was opened and connected.

Around
Nishinomiya Shrine
Koshien Stadium

References

External links
 West Nippon Expressway Company (official website)

Roads in Hyōgo Prefecture
Hanshin Expressway
Nishinomiya